Dominique J. Barber (born August 2, 1986) is a former American football safety. He was drafted by the Houston Texans in the sixth round of the 2008 NFL Draft. He played college football at Minnesota.

He is the son of former NFL running back Marion Barber, Jr., younger brother of former NFL running back Marion Barber III and older brother of Minnesota Golden Gophers linebacker Thomas Barber.  His cousin is Peyton Barber who plays running back and played college football at Auburn.

Early years
A 2004 graduate of Wayzata High School. Rivals.com ranked Barber as the 42nd-best player at his position in 2003. He was selected for the SuperPrep Midwest Team and ranked as the 58th-best player. He was also selected as a PrepStar All-Midwest Region. Barber was named all-state and all-county his senior season at defensive back and was an all-conference and all-area selection his senior season at running back. He recorded one interception, which he returned for a touchdown in 2003. He also rushed for 911 yards on 138 carries with nine scores his last season, while also recording 25 catches for 288 yards with three touchdowns. While at Wayzata, he also lettered twice in hockey and once in baseball.

College career
In 2004, Barber played in nine games, recording four tackles and one pass breakup. He also joined Robert McGarry and Gary Russell as the only Gophers to letter as true freshmen. His father, Marion Jr. and brother, Marion III also lettered as true freshmen. He also recorded one tackle against Alabama in the Music City Bowl.

In 2005, Barber appeared in all 12 games, finishing the season with 13 tackles and a blocked punt against Colorado State, which resulted in a touchdown by Alex Daniels. Barber also recorded three tackles, against Virginia in the Music City Bowl. He also earned a second letter, in 2005.

In 2006, Barber was named All-Big Ten Honorable Mention by the media. He also established career-highs in every statistical category. He also tied for fifth in the conference with 0.31 interceptions per game. He made his first career start in the season opener at Kent State. Barber intercepted the first pass of his career against Temple. At Purdue, Barber held the wide receiver Dorien Bryant to just 59 yards receiving on six catches, he also broke up two passes. He also, established a new career high with eight tackles vs. Penn State. Also, recorded career firsts with a fumble recovery and a blocked PAT at the top-ranked Ohio State. Against Indiana, Barber returned an interception 45 yards for a touchdown, broke up another pass and forced the first fumble of his career. At Michigan State, he picked off a career-high two passes. His interception of MSU quarterback Brian Hoyer’s pass in the end zone on the first play of the second quarter turned the momentum of the game. He also, had six tackles in the Insight Bowl against Texas Tech. In 2006, Barber also, earned a third letter.

In 2007, Dominique started all 12 games. He was named to the All-Big Ten second team after leading the team with 100 tackles.

College statistics

Professional career

Barber was selected in the sixth round (173rd overall) of the 2008 NFL Draft by the Houston Texans. He appeared in 12 games (no starts) his rookie season, recording 15 tackles, a sack, and a pass deflection.

Barber played in 13 games (six starts) for the Texans in 2009 before being placed on injured reserve with a hamstring injury on December 2. He finished the season with 33 tackles and his first career interception.

Post-professional career
Barber would join the coaching staff at his alma mater under head coach Jerry Kill in 2014.

References

External links

Official Website
Houston Texans bio
Minnesota Golden Gophers bio

1986 births
Living people
People from Plymouth, Minnesota
Players of American football from Minnesota
American football safeties
Minnesota Golden Gophers football players
Houston Texans players
Sportspeople from the Minneapolis–Saint Paul metropolitan area
Barber family